Masonville Creek is a river in Delaware County, New York. It flows into the Bennettsville Creek east of Bennettsville.

References

Rivers of New York (state)
Rivers of Delaware County, New York
Rivers of Chenango County, New York